Texas is ranked twenty-fifth among US states by median household income, with a per capita income of $19,617 (2000).

Texas counties ranked by per capita income

Note: Data is from the 2010 United States Census Data and the 2006-2010 American Community Survey 5-Year Estimates.

See also
 Highest-income counties in the United States
 Lowest-income counties in the United States

References

External links
 The Boom Areas of America - (CNN 2007)

United States locations by per capita income
Economy of Texas
Income